Evgeniy Prokopchuk (born 24 March 1994) is a Russian judoka.

He won a medal at the 2019 World Judo Championships.

References

External links
 

1994 births
Living people
Russian male judoka
Universiade medalists in judo
Universiade gold medalists for Russia
Medalists at the 2019 Summer Universiade
21st-century Russian people